Damian Kulig (born June 23, 1987) is a Polish professional basketball player for Stal Ostrów Wielkopolski of the Polish Basketball League (PLK). He represents the Polish national team internationally.

Professional career
On March 22, 2012, Kulig moved from Poznań to sign with the Polish team Turów Zgorzelec until the end of the 2011–12 season. In May 2012, the club extended contract with him for one more season.

In the 2014–15 season, Kulig played in the EuroLeague for the first time in his career. Over 10 games, he led his team with 15.2 points, also having 5.5 rebounds and 1.5 assists per game. However, Turów Zgorzelec was eliminated in the first phase of the competition, being last in the Group C with a 1–9 score. On April 29, 2015, Kulig won the PLK Most Valuable Player Award. Turów Zgorzelec finished the season in 2nd place of the Polish League, after a 4–2 loss to Zielona Góra in the final series.

On June 11, 2015, he signed a contract with the Turkish team Trabzonspor.

On July 8, 2016, he signed with Banvit.

Kulig signed with Twarde Pierniki Toruń on January 15, 2019. He averaged 10.1 points and 6 rebounds per game. Kulig re-signed with the team to a two-year extension on July 15, 2020.

On June 5, 2021, he signed with Stal Ostrów Wielkopolski of the Polish Basketball League (PLK).

International career

Kulig represented Poland at the EuroBasket 2015. Over six tournament games, he averaged 6.7 points and 5.7 rebounds on 45.2 shooting from the field.

Career statistics

EuroLeague

|-
| style="text-align:left;"| 2014–15
| style="text-align:left;"| Turów
| 10 || 1 || 25.3 || .563 || .472 || .633 || 5.5 || 1.5 || .6 || 1.1 || 15.2 || 14.5
|- class="sortbottom"
| style="text-align:center;" colspan=2 | Career
| 10 || 1 || 25.3 || .563 || .472 || .633 || 5.5 || 1.5 || .6 || 1.1 || 15.2 || 14.5

Honours

Trophies
Polish League (1): 2013–14

Individual awards
PLK Most Valuable Player: 2015
All-PLK Team: 2015
PLK Most Improved Player: 2012

References

External links

Damian Kulig at eurobasket.com
Damian Kulig at euroleague.net
Damian Kulig at fiba.com

1987 births
Living people
2019 FIBA Basketball World Cup players
Bandırma B.İ.K. players
Centers (basketball)
İstanbul Büyükşehir Belediyespor basketball players
Polish expatriate basketball people in Turkey
Polish men's basketball players
Power forwards (basketball)
Sportspeople from Piotrków Trybunalski
Stal Ostrów Wielkopolski players
Trabzonspor B.K. players
Turów Zgorzelec players
Twarde Pierniki Toruń players